Cornel Chin-Sue (born 17 September 1976) is a former Jamaican football midfielder who played for Arnett Gardens F.C.

Club career
Nicknamed Chaps, he was a member of the locally famous 'Gang of Five', with Kevin Wilson, Everton Bunsie, Kwame Richardson and Eugene Barnes being the others. Chin-Sue is known to be a good tackler and man marker. He has skippered the Arnett team for several years.

International career
He made his debut for the Reggae Boyz in 1999 against Bolivia and played his last in 2004 against Guatemala, collecting a total of 13 caps, scoring one goal. He was part of Jamaica's 2003 CONCACAF Gold Cup squad but did not play in any of their games.

External links
 Player profile – ReggaeBoyzsc.com

1976 births
Living people
Jamaican footballers
Jamaica international footballers
Arnett Gardens F.C. players
Jamaican people of Chinese descent
Hakka sportspeople
Sportspeople of Chinese descent
Association football midfielders
National Premier League players
People from Spanish Town